Frank Stacy Tavenner (April 25, 1866 – December 7, 1950) was an American Democratic politician who served as a member of the Virginia Senate, representing the state's 10th district.

His son, Frank S. Tavenner, Jr. went on to be United States Attorney for the Western District of Virginia during administration of Franklin D. Roosevelt and was a lawyer for the House Un-American Activities Committee.

References

External links

 
 

1866 births
1950 deaths
Democratic Party Virginia state senators
People from Accomac, Virginia
20th-century American politicians